Massimo Loviso (born 9 April 1984) is an Italian footballer who plays as a midfielder for Castelnuovo Vomano.

Career

Bologna
Born in Bentivoglio, the Province of Bologna, Loviso started his career at Bologna. After made his debut on 8 November 2003, a 0–0 draw with Brescia as starter, Loviso mainly played as backup.

Livorno
In June 2007, he joined Serie A side Livorno in a co-ownership deal for €200,000 fee. He only made 16 starts in the first season. Loviso followed the team relegated to Serie B after Livorno bought him outright in June 2008, for an additional €1,000. Partnered with Alessandro Diamanti and Antonio Candreva in the midfield, he won promotion back to Serie A.

Torino
In August 2009, he was signed by newly relegated Serie B side Torino in another co-ownership deal for €900,000 fee in a 3-year contract.

During 2009–10 season, Ultras of Torino attacked the players during David Di Michele's birthday party. After the incident the players involved: Di Michele, Loviso, Riccardo Colombo, Aimo Diana, Marco Pisano, Francesco Pratali, Paolo Zanetti were transferred to other clubs and only Rolando Bianchi, Matteo Rubin and Angelo Ogbonna were remained.

He left for Lecce along with Di Michele on 1 February 2010. Torino also paid Lecce premiums of €300,000 for the loans.

In June 2010 Torino signed Loviso from Livorno outright for free. Loviso did not leave Turin in 2010–11 season but only able to play with its Primavera reserve team as an overage player.

Crotone
In January 2011 he left for Crotone in a temporary deal and on 20 July 2011 Torino terminated his contract in order to join Crotone on a free transfer.

In August 2012 he left for Ascoli Calcio 1898 in a temporary deal, with Vito Falconieri moved to opposite direction also on loan.

Parma
On 29 June 2013. few days before the closure of 2012–13 financial year of F.C.Crotone S.r.l. and Parma F.C. S.p.A., Loviso was sold to Parma in exchange for Fabio Lebran to Crotone. 50% registration rights of both players were "valued" €400,000. Loviso signed a 2-year contract (later extended one more year). In July 2013 Loviso was loaned to Cremonese. In June 2014 Loviso was signed by Parma outright. On 20 August 2014, he was signed by Gubbio in a temporary deal.

Lega Pro clubs
On 22 June 2015 Loviso became a free agent after the formal bankruptcy of Parma. On 7 July 2015 he was signed by Alessandria in a 2-year contract.

On 22 August 2016 Loviso joined AlbinoLeffe on a free transfer. The club was re-admitted to 2016–17 Lega Pro to fill the vacancy.

On 30 July 2019 he signed with Rende.

On 4 August 2020 he joined Serie D club Castelnuovo Vomano.

References

External links
 Profile at La Gazzetta dello Sport (2007–08) 
 Profile at AIC.Football.it 
 FIGC 
 

Italian footballers
Italy under-21 international footballers
Serie A players
Serie B players
Serie C players
Serie D players
Bologna F.C. 1909 players
A.S. Sambenedettese players
U.S. Livorno 1915 players
Torino F.C. players
F.C. Crotone players
U.S. Lecce players
Cosenza Calcio players
Modena F.C. players
Association football midfielders
Sportspeople from the Metropolitan City of Bologna
1984 births
Living people
Footballers from Emilia-Romagna